Statistics of Allsvenskan in season 1984.

Overview
The league was contested by 12 teams, with IFK Göteborg winning the league and the Swedish championship after the play-offs.

League table

Results

Allsvenskan play-offs
The 1984 Allsvenskan play-offs was the third edition of the competition. The eight best placed teams from Allsvenskan  qualified to the competition. Allsvenskan champions IFK Göteborg won the competition and the Swedish championship after defeating IFK Norrköping who finished fifth in the league.

Quarter-finals

First leg

Second leg

Semi-finals

First leg

Second leg

Final

Season statistics

Top scorers

Footnotes

References 

Allsvenskan seasons
Swed
Swed
1